Anjali (മലയാളം: അഞ്ജലി(ചലച്ചിത്രം)) is a 1977 Indian Malayalam film, directed by I V Sasi and produced by A Reghunath. The film stars Prem Nazir, Sharada, M. G. Soman, Jayan, Adoor Bhasi, Sankaradi, Bahadoor, Janardanan, Kuthiravattam Pappu, Rajakokila in the lead roles. The film's music was composed by G Devarajan.

Cast
Prem Nazir 
Sharada 
M. G. Soman
Jayan 
Adoor Bhasi 
Sankaradi 
Bahadoor 
Janardanan 
Kuthiravattam Pappu 
Rajakokila

Soundtrack
The music was composed by G. Devarajan and the lyrics were written by Sreekumaran Thampi.

References

External links
 

1977 films
1970s Malayalam-language films
Films directed by I. V. Sasi